Kalmady Gopala Poojary is an Indian politician who is the current Chairman of Karnataka State Road Transport Corporation and member of Karnataka Legislative Assembly from Baindur.
He was born in Kalmady, Byndoor in August of 1959 to a poor farmer family. After graduation Gopala Poojary moved to Mumbai to find work. On his return to Karnataka, Gopala Poojary started his restaurant business in 1984. Introduced to politics through his political Godfather S Bangarappa. Gopala Poojary contests election for the first time as a member of the KCP in 1994 garnering 10436 votes. Gopala Poojary contests the 1996 by election as an INC candidate for the first time winning the election by 8000 votes. Gopala Poojary goes on to win the next two elections registering a hattrick of wins in 1996, 1999 and 2004. He tasted defeat for the first time in 2008. He later went on to hold the Udupi District President Post. Gopala Poojary contests election once again in 2013 and wins by a margin of 31000 votes. He is defeated in the election of 2018. Gopala Poojary is considered to be a very senior leader in Udupi and is regarded as "Badavara Bandu" and lauded for being a simple politician in his hometown Byndoor.

Constituency
He represents the Byndoor constituency.

Political Party
He is from the Indian National Congress.
He has been elected four times from the Byndoor constituency. He has contested 6 elections as a member of the Indian National Congress winning four times. He is regarded as a strong and loyal leader of the Congress Party from the South Canara region. In 2004 he was the only Congress candidate to win an assembly election out of the five constituencies in Udupi District.

References 

Living people
Indian National Congress politicians from Karnataka
1959 births
Karnataka MLAs 1999–2004
Karnataka MLAs 2004–2007
Karnataka MLAs 2013–2018